Mantidactylus albofrenatus is a species of frog in the family Mantellidae. It is endemic to eastern Madagascar near An'Ala and Andasibe. Common name eastern Madagascar frog has been proposed for it.

Description
Adult males measure  and adult females  in snout–vent length. The legs are short. The tympanum is large in the males, larger than the eye. Males have distinct femoral glands. The toes have rudimentary webbing. The dorsal colouration is brown, forming a distinct dorsolateral colour border with the dark brown flanks. A distinct light stripe runs from the forelimb insertion to (almost) the nostril. The throat is dark grey with a distinct pattern of white spots forming a median row. The hind limbs have dark crossbands.

The male advertisement call is a rapid series of 31–36 short pulsed notes.

Habitat and conservation
It is often found near streams. Calling males have been found near streams during the daytime. The eggs are presumably laid on land.

It is a locally abundant species, but it is only from two localities and its population is suspected to be decreasing because of ongoing habitat loss and deterioration. It occurs in the Analamazaotra Special Reserve.

References

albofrenatus
Endemic frogs of Madagascar
Amphibians described in 1892
Taxa named by Fritz Müller (doctor)
Taxonomy articles created by Polbot